4680 may refer to:

 4680 (number)
 4680s (decade), and the year 4680 AD/CE
 IBM 4680 OS, a POS operating system based on Digital Research's Concurrent DOS 286 since 1986
 Round One Corporation (TYO: 4680), a Japan-based amusement store chain
 4680 Lohrmann, an asteroid
 Tesla 4680, a Lithium-ion battery cell developed by Tesla, Inc.

See also

 
 46800 (disambiguation)
 468 (disambiguation)
 468 (number)